Maria Anzbach is a railway station serving Maria Anzbach in Lower Austria.

References 

Railway stations in Lower Austria
Austrian Federal Railways